Palanga Pier is a wooden pier to the Baltic Sea located in Palanga, the most popular and biggest summer resort in Lithuania.

History

In 1589 Grand Duke Sigismund III Vasa granted the right to expand the Port of Palanga to the English people, who built a bridge to the sea, installed a stone jetty and prepared the seabed for the development of maritime transport.

In 1882  supervised the construction of a new Palanga Pier with a length of 380 metres. It was primarily dedicated for exporting bricks, however, during summer time it was used for walks. It had an attic in the beginning of the pier for protecting pedestrians from rain and was connected to a tram line. Since 1892 it was dedicated for the use of pedestrians only and become a popular sea-side destination for walks.

In 1998 the latest reconstruction of the Palanga Pier was completed, and the renewed pier's length become 470 metres.

Gallery

References

Piers in Lithuania
Buildings and structures in Palanga
Landmarks in Palanga
Tourist attractions in Palanga